Sinagra is an outer northern suburb of Perth, Western Australia, located within the City of Wanneroo.

This suburb, formerly part of the suburb of Wanneroo, is named after the Sinagra family, migrants from Italy who arrived in the Wanneroo area in the 1920s. 
The City of Wanneroo established a sister city relationship with Sinagra, Sicily as a large number of families migrated from there to make a new home in Wanneroo.
Sam Sinagra owned a shop in Wanneroo, and the family were prominent citizens. The suburb name was approved on 3 April 1995.

There are no bus routes directly serving the centre of the suburb. However, routes 467 and 468 operate along the western edge on Wanneroo Road, while routes 389 and 467 also operate along the southern edge on Dundebar Road.

References

External links 
  Oral History Transcript - Nicholas Trandos explaining Sister City establishment
  Oral History Transcript - Giuseppe (Joe) Sinagra

Suburbs of Perth, Western Australia
Suburbs of the City of Wanneroo